Corallina is a genus of red seaweeds with hard, abrasive calcareous skeletons in the family Corallinaceae. They are stiff, branched plants with articulations.

Species 
 Corallina aberrans (Yendo) K.R.Hind & G.W.Saunders 
 Corallina abundans Me.Lemoine 
 Corallina arbuscula Postels & Ruprecht
 Corallina armata J.D.Hooker & Harvey
 Corallina bathybentha E.Y.Dawson 
 Corallina berteroi Montagne ex Kützing 
 Corallina bifurca Kützing
 Corallina binangonensis Ishijima 
 Corallina confusa Yendo 
 Corallina cossmannii Me.Lemoine
 Corallina crassisima (Yendo) K.Hind & G.W.Saunders 
 Corallina declinata (Yendo) K.Hind & G.W.Saunders 
 Corallina ferreyrae E.Y.Dawson, Acleto & Foldvik 
 Corallina goughensis Y.M.Chamberlain 
 Corallina hombronii (Montagne) Montagne ex Kützing 
 Corallina maxima (Yendo) K.R.Hind & G.W.Saunders
 Corallina melobesioides (Segawa) Martone, S.C.Lindstrom, K.A.Miller & P.W.Gabrielson 
 Corallina microptera Montagne
 Corallina muscoides Kützing
 Corallina officinalis Linnaeus - type
 Corallina panizzoi R.Schnetter & U.Richter 
 Corallina pilulifera Postels & Ruprecht  
 Corallina pinnatifolia (Manza) E.Y.Dawson  
 Corallina polysticha E.Y.Dawson 
 Corallina rigida Kützing  
 Corallina sachalinensis Klochkova  
 Corallina sandwicensis Reinbold 
 Corallina vancouveriensis Yendo

References

Corallinaceae
Red algae genera